Manasunna Maaraju is a 2000 Indian Telugu-language drama film directed by Muthyala Subbaiah. The film stars Dr. Rajasekhar and Laya in the lead roles. It was a remake of the Malayalam film Kottaram Veettile Apputtan (1998).

Cast
Dr. Rajasekhar
Laya
Rajitha
Kota Srinivasa Rao
Asha Saini
Brahmanandam
Manorama

Soundtrack
The soundtrack was composed by Vandemataram Srinivas.
1) "Nenu Gaali" - Udit Narayan, Anuradha Paudwal, Tippu (Humming)
2) "O Prema"(Version l) - Sonu Nigam
3) "O Prema"(Version ll) - Rajesh Krishnan
4) "Allari Priyuda" - Shankar Mahadevan, Swarnalatha
5) "Maaghamasam" - K. S. Chithra, Udit Narayan
 6) "Eddulabandi Ekki"  -Sukhwinder Singh, Nithyasree Mahadevan
 7) "Oodala Oodala Marri Chettu" - Mano, Sujatha Mohan, Malgudi Subha, Tippu

References

External link 
 

2000s Telugu-language films
Indian drama films
Telugu remakes of Malayalam films
2000 films
Films directed by Muthyala Subbaiah